Defence Council may refer to:

 Croatian Defence Council, the main military formation of the Croats during the Bosnian War charged with achieving military objectives
 Defence Council of the United Kingdom, the body legally entrusted with the defence of the United Kingdom and its overseas territories
 Provisional National Defence Council, the Ghanaian government after the People's National Party's elected government was overthrown on the previous election
 Defense Council of the Supreme Soviet of the Soviet Union, officially a state organ of the Soviet Union it functioned informally as a body subordinate to the CPSU Politburo